A partlet or partlett was a 16th century fashion accessory. The partlet was a sleeveless garment worn over the neck and shoulders, either worn over a dress or worn to fill in a low neckline.

The earliest partlets appeared in late 15th century fashion. They were made of silk or linen, and were worn to fill in the low necklines of both men's and women's Burgundian dress. Men continued to wear partlets, usually of rich materials, with the low-cut doublets of the early 16th century.

Early 16th century women's partlets were made in a variety of fabrics and colors, although black was most popular. Black partlets worn over the gown, usually of velvet or satin for the upper classes, are an earlier style. A wardrobe warrant of June 1538 ordered black velvet for a "French partlet" for Princess Mary. These black partlets may be seen in a number of portraits of Tudor court ladies by Hans Holbein the Younger, as well as in Dutch paintings of market women throughout the 16th century.

Fine partlets made of linen lawn, with small standing collars and ruffles, could be worn directly over a low-necked smock, or over the kirtle. The "Pelican Portrait" of Elizabeth I shows the Elizabethan fashion for matching partlet and sleeves worked with blackwork embroidery. Such sets of partlet and sleeves were common New Year's gifts to the queen. In 1562, Lady Cobham gifted the queen "a partelett and a peire of sleeves of sypers wrought with silver and black silke".

Elaborate lattice-work partlets were decorated with gold and jewels or pearls, such as that worn by Eleanor of Toledo in the portrait by Bronzino. This was called "Caulle fashion" in England. In 1563 Elizabeth's silkwoman Alice Montague employed a woman "altering and translating" the queen's partlets. 1568 Elizabeth I set her "Mistress Launder" to work to "translate" her partlets with 520 pearls costing a penny each.

The origin of the term 'partlet' (attested from 1515) is uncertain, but it may derive from 'Dame Partlet', a traditional name for a hen, perhaps in reference to the ruffle of feathers on some hens' necks.

Gallery

See also
 Guimpe
 Chemisette

References 

16th-century fashion
Fashion accessories
Neckwear